Allograpta piurana is a species of hoverfly.

Description
This species was described by Shannon (1927) based on a female specimen collected in the Department Piura in Peru. It is part of the Allograpta obliqua species group.

Range
This species has been recorded in Chile and Peru.

Habitat
Inland valleys to highland ecosystems.

Biology
Barahona-Segovia et al (2021) lists the following, mainly exotic, plants visited by this species:  E. pectinatus; Myoporum sp.; Rosa sp.; T. officinale; Phoenix dactylifera L.; and Veronica persica Poir.

Etymology
Shannon (1927) did not explicitly state the etymology of the specific epithet, but it seems to be derived from the Department where the type specimen was collected, Piura.

Taxonomy
Shannon (1927) distinguished A. piurana from A. hortensis Philippi by a yellow spot on the metapleura (=katatergum + anatergum), dark apical margin of the scutellum, oblique pair of bands on the second tergite, and yellow markings of remaining tergites more parallel to each other.

References

Syrphini
Insects described in 1927